Deh-e Seyyed Ahmad (also Romanized as Deh-e Seyyed Aḩmad; also known as Deh-e Seyyed) is a village in Ahmadfedaleh Rural District, Sardasht District, Dezful County, Khuzestan Province, Iran. At the 2006 census, its population was 21, in 4 families.

References 

Populated places in Dezful County